Mark Nicholas Bowen (born 6 December 1967) is a former English cricketer active from 1991 to 2000, playing for Northamptonshire.

Bowen was born in Redcar, Yorkshire. He appeared in 67 first-class matches as a right arm fast medium bowler who was a righthanded batsman. He is regularly regarded as the second best bowler to have played cricket for Redcar CC, only to Mick McCabe. Bowen took 183 first-class wickets with a best performance of seven for 73 and scored 817 runs with a highest score of 32.

Bowen now plays Hockey for Keswick HC, He regularly appears for the 1st xl  playing central midfield.

References

Living people
1967 births
English cricketers
Northamptonshire cricketers
Nottinghamshire cricketers
Cumberland cricketers